Antonio Pietro Francesco Zucchi  (1 May 1726 – 1 December 1795) was an Italian painter and printmaker of the Neoclassic period.

Life
Zucchi was born in Venice, he studied under his uncle Carlo Zucchi and later Francesco Fontebasso and Jacopo Amigoni. 

He married the painter Angelica Kauffman in 1781, who late in life moved with him to Rome. In Rome Zucchi produced a number of etchings of capriccio and veduta of classical buildings or ruins. He worked with Robert Adam in the decoration of houses in England, including Kenwood, Newby Hall, Osterley Park, Nostell Priory, and Luton House.

In 1756, he was elected to the membership of the Accademia di Belle Arti in Venice. In England, he was elected as an associate to the Royal Academy of Arts in 1770.

Lady Boringdon commissioned him to paint the ceilings of rooms redesigned by Robert Adam at Saltram House in Devon. She also bought paintings from his wife for the house.

He died in Rome in 1795.

References

External links
 

1726 births
1795 deaths
18th-century Italian painters
Italian male painters
Painters from Venice
Italian neoclassical painters
Italian vedutisti
Painters of ruins
Angelica Kauffman
Associates of the Royal Academy